In aeronautics, inertia coupling, also referred to as inertial coupling and inertial roll coupling, is a potentially catastrophic phenomenon of high-speed flight which caused the loss of aircraft and pilots before the design features to counter it (e.g. a big enough fin) were understood. It occurs when the inertia of a heavy fuselage exceeds the ability of the aerodynamic forces and moments generated by the wing and empennage to stabilize the aircraft. The problem became apparent as jet fighter aircraft and research aircraft were developed with narrow wingspans, that had relatively low roll inertia, caused by a long slender high-density fuselage, compared to the pitch and yaw inertias.

The term inertia/inertial coupling referring to divergence during a rolling maneuver has been described as misleading because the complete problem is one of aerodynamic as well as inertia coupling. Contributions to the maneuver are complex and include inertial coupling, aerodynamic coupling and the inertia ratios about the three axes, all of which occur simultaneously. However, inertial coupling has also been defined as essentially a gyroscopic effect, i.e. a tendency of a fuselage, when rolled rapidly, to swing away from the direction of flight and become broadside to the wind, and analyzed as such by Phillips. Inertial roll coupling has been defined as a resonant divergence in pitch or yaw when roll rate equals the lower of the pitch or yaw natural frequencies.

Description
Inertia coupling will tend to occur when an aircraft with the weight distribution described above is quickly rolled about an axis other than its roll axis. The tendency can be countered by a number of strategies which include increasing directional stability and reducing allowed roll rate and duration and limiting angle of attack for performing rolling maneuvers.

The cause of the disturbing motion may be visualised by thinking of the aircraft mass being concentrated in two locations, "dumbbell-fashion" on its roll axis, one in front of the centre of gravity and the other behind. The aircraft will be flying along its aerodynamic or wind axis with the "dumbbell" at some angle of attack. Rolling about the aerodynamic axis will tend to cause the "off-axis" masses to move outwards.

The trend in fighter aircraft design through the 1950s of short wing spans, fuselages of high density and flight at high altitude all tended to increase the inertia forces due to rolling in comparison with the aerodynamic restoring forces provided by the longitudinal and directional stabilities. Rolling motion introduces coupling between longitudinal and lateral motions of the aircraft. Although a typical jet aircraft has most of its mass distributed close to its centerline, and the aerodynamic forces and moments in planes which provide some stabilization (such that small fluctuations in control tend to return it to attitude equilibrium), it is important to remember that aircraft realistically always fly with a small non-zero random rate of yawing and pitching.

Early history
Inertial roll coupling was predicted and analyzed as a gyroscopic effect in 1948 by William Phillips who worked for the NACA. His analysis predated the aircraft that would experience the violent motions he predicted, the X-series research aircraft and Century-series fighter aircraft in the early 1950s. Prior to this time, aircraft tended to have greater width than length, and their mass was generally distributed closer to the center of mass. This was especially true for propeller aircraft, but equally true for early jet fighters as well. It was only when the aircraft began to sacrifice aerodynamic surface area in order to reduce drag, and use longer fineness ratios that reduced supersonic drag, that the effect became obvious. In these cases, the aircraft was generally much more fuselage-heavy, allowing its gyroscopic effect to overwhelm the small control surfaces.

Inertial roll coupling was one of three distinct coupling modes which followed one another at Mach 3.2 killing pilot Captain Mel Apt in his first flight in the rocket-powered Bell X-2 on 27 September 1956. Inertial roll coupling had nearly killed Chuck Yeager in the X-1A three years earlier. The roll coupling study of the X-3 Stiletto (first flown in 1952) was extremely short but produced valuable data. Abrupt aileron rolls were conducted at Mach 0.92 and 1.05 and produced "disturbing" motions and excessive accelerations and loads. The first two production aircraft to experience inertial roll coupling were the F-100 Super Sabre and F-102 Delta Dagger (both first flown in 1953). The F-100 was modified with a larger vertical tail to increase its directional stability. The F-102 was modified to increase wing and tail areas and was fitted with an augmented control system. To enable pilot control during dynamic motion maneuvers the tail area of the F-102A was increased 40%. In the case of the F-101 Voodoo (first flown in 1954), a stability augmentation system was retrofitted to the A models to help combat this problem. The Douglas Skyray was not able to incorporate any design changes to control inertial roll coupling and instead had restricted maneuver limits at which coupling effects did not cause problems. The Lockheed F-104 Starfighter (first flown in 1956) had its stabilator (horizontal tail surface) mounted atop its vertical fin to reduce inertia coupling.

See also
 Upset Prevention and Recovery Training

References

Aviation risks
Aerodynamics
Chuck Yeager